Bárbaro Rafael Cañizares Hernandez (born November 21, 1979) is a Cuban-American  former first baseman. Listed at 6' 3", 230 lb., Cañizares batted and threw right-handed. He was born in Havana.

Career in Cuba
Cañizares played from 1997 through 2003 for the Industriales and Metropolitanos teams of the Cuban National Series. Overall, he posted a batting average of .303 (537-for-1,775) with 38 home runs and 294 runs batted in in 520 games. He guided Industriales together with MLB player Kendrys Morales to the postseason in 2005.

Minor League Baseball career
While playing for the Cuban national team, he sold his jersey to a fan after an international game. Unbeknownst to Cañizares, the fan was a member of the United States Interests Section in Havana. As a result, Cañizares received a lifetime suspension from Cuban baseball.

In February 2004, Cañizares defected from Cuba along with Michel Abreu and Yosandy Ibañez. The three later played professionally together in Nicaraguan baseball. He then signed with the Atlanta Braves on February 4, 2006.

After that, Cañizares has been consistently held in the Minor Leagues, playing for several teams in different countries.

Major Leagues
Cañizares was called up to the Atlanta Braves on June 11, 2009, making his major league debut the same day appearing fourth in the batting order and playing first base.

Canizares played for the Winnipeg Goldeyes of the American Association of Independent Professional Baseball during the 2012 season.

Mexican baseball
Cañizares also played in Mexico, where he earned Mexican Pacific League MVP honors with the Yaquis de Obregón club in two different times. In addition, he captured the Mexican League batting crown in 2011, after hitting a .396 average with the Guerreros de Oaxaca.

Tigres de Quintana Roo
On April 23, 2017, Cañizares signed with the Tigres de Quintana Roo of the Mexican Baseball League. He was released on May 15, 2017.

Algodoneros de Unión Laguna
On April 5, 2018, Cañizares signed with the Algodoneros de Unión Laguna of the Mexican Baseball League.

Retirement
Cañizares retired as an active player following the 2018 season, and stayed in the Mexican League as a hitting coach for the Olmecas de Tabasco.

Other leagues
In between, Cañizares has played with the Winnipeg Goldeyes of the American Association, as well as in Dominican Republic and Venezuela winter ball.

See also

List of baseball players who defected from Cuba

References

External links

1979 births
Living people
2013 World Baseball Classic players
Águilas del Zulia players
Algodoneros de Unión Laguna players
Atlanta Braves players
Defecting Cuban baseball players
Cuban expatriate baseball players in Japan
Fukuoka SoftBank Hawks players
Gigantes del Cibao players
Guerreros de Oaxaca players
Gulf Coast Braves players
Gwinnett Braves players
Industriales de La Habana players
Major League Baseball first basemen
Major League Baseball players from Cuba
Cuban expatriate baseball players in the United States
Mayos de Navojoa players
Metropolitanos de La Habana players
Mississippi Braves players
Myrtle Beach Pelicans players
Nippon Professional Baseball first basemen
Richmond Braves players
Baseball players from Havana
Tiburones de La Guaira players
Cuban expatriate baseball players in Venezuela
Toros del Este players
Cuban expatriate baseball players in the Dominican Republic
Winnipeg Goldeyes players
Yaquis de Obregón players
Cuban expatriate baseball players in Mexico